Barry Lindsay Reed (born 27 September 1937 at Southsea, Hampshire) is a former English first-class cricketer. Reed was a right-handed batsman who bowled right-arm slow.

Reed made his first-class debut for Hampshire in 1958 against Cambridge University. It would then be seven years before Reed would represent Hampshire again in 1965, making his County Championship debut against Lancashire. Reed represented Hampshire in 122 first-class matches from 1965 to 1970, with his final appearance for the county coming against Nottinghamshire in the 1970 County Championship. Reed also played one-day cricket for Hampshire, with his one-day debut coming in the 1966 Gillette Cup against Lincolnshire. From 1966 to 1972, Reed played 32 one day matches for Hampshire, with his final one-day game coming against Kent in the 1972 John Player League.

In his 122 first-class matches for the county, Reed scored 4,910 runs at a batting average of 24.30, with 29 half centuries, 2 centuries and a high score of 138 against Oxford University in 1970. In addition Reed took 57 catches in the field for the county.

In Reed's 32 one-day matches for the county he scored 900 runs at a batting average of 36.00, with 1 half century, 2 centuries and a high score 143* against Buckinghamshire in 1970.

In addition to playing first-class matches for Hampshire, Reed also represented the Marylebone Cricket Club in a single first-class match in 1966 against Ireland on the Marylebone Cricket Club's tour of Ireland.

External links
Barry Reed at Cricinfo
Barry Reed at CricketArchive
Matches and detailed statistics for Barry Reed

1937 births
Living people
People from Southsea
English cricketers
Hampshire cricketers
Marylebone Cricket Club cricketers